Sino-Indian skirmish may refer to the following military clashes between India and China:

1967 Sino-Indian skirmish, alongside the border of Himalayan Kingdom of Sikkim
1987 Sino-Indian skirmish, at the Sumdorong Chu Valley
2020 Sino-Indian skirmishes, at various points, incl. near Ladakh and Sikkim

See also
 Sino-Indian War
 Sino-Indian border dispute
 India-Pakistan border skirmishes (disambiguation)
 Indian War (disambiguation)
 Chinese Indian (disambiguation)
 Indo-Chinese (disambiguation)